Elections were held in Elgin County, Ontario on October 27, 2014 in conjunction with municipal elections across the province.

Elgin County Council
Elgin County Council consists of the mayors of the constituent municipalities plus the deputy mayors of Central Elgin and Malahide.

Aylmer

Bayham

Central Elgin

Dutton/Dunwich

Malahide

Southwold

West Elgin

References
 

Elgin
Elgin County